Frederick Euphenia Westervelt (February 18, 1878 - May 4, 1955) was a professional baseball umpire who worked in three major leagues for parts of five years. Westervelt umpired in the American League in 1911 and 1912, the Federal League in 1915 and the National League in 1922 and 1923. He umpired 345 major league games.

References

1878 births
1955 deaths
Major League Baseball umpires
Sportspeople from Bergen County, New Jersey